Johann Friedrich Karl Keil or Carl Friedrich Keil (26 February 1807 – 5 May 1888) was a conservative German Lutheran Old Testament commentator. Keil was appointed to the theological faculty of Dorpat in Estonia where he taught Bible, New Testament exegesis, and Oriental languages. In 1859 he was called to serve the Lutheran church in Leipzig. In 1887 he moved to Rödletz, where he died. Keil was a conservative critic who reacted strongly against the scientific biblical criticism of his day. He strongly supported Mosaic authorship of the Pentateuch. He maintained the validity of the historico-critical investigation of the Bible only if it proved the existence of New Testament revelation in the Scriptures. To this aim he edited (with Franz Delitzsch) his principal work, a commentary on the Bible, Biblischer Kommentar über das Alte Testament (5 vols., 1866–82; Biblical Commentary on the Old Testament, 5 vols., 1872–77). The work remains his most enduring contribution to biblical studies. He also published commentaries on Maccabees and New Testament literature.

Biography
Keil was born at Lauterbach near Oelsnitz, Kingdom of Saxony, and died at Rätz, Saxony.

He is best known for his contributions to the Keil and Delitzsch commentaries, a ten-volume set written with Franz Delitzsch.

Keil was a student of Ernst Wilhelm Hengstenberg.

Works

Old Testament Commentary

From the commentary compilations by Keil and Delitzsch:
 Volume 1: Pentateuch 
 Volume 2: Joshua, Judges, Ruth, 1 & 2 Samuel 
 Volume 3: 1 & 2 Kings, 1 & 2 Chronicles 
 Volume 4: Ezra, Nehemiah, Esther, Job 
 Volume 5: Psalms 
 Volume 6: Proverbs, Ecclesiastes, Song of Songs 
 Volume 7: Isaiah 
 Volume 8: Jeremiah, Lamentations 
 Volume 9: Ezekiel, Daniel 
 Volume 10: Minor Prophets

References

Further reading
 Schaller, Manfred, "Topics – theology, philosophy, religion – church history" (German)
  
  Also available online at http://biblehub.com/commentaries/kad/.

1807 births
1888 deaths
People from the Kingdom of Saxony
German Lutheran theologians
Bible commentators
19th-century German Protestant theologians
German male non-fiction writers
19th-century male writers
Lutheran biblical scholars
19th-century Lutherans